The 1.KFA Fireballs Wielkopolska is a Polish American football club from Poznań, Greater Poland Voivodeship, which currently competes in the PLFA II, the second division of Polish American Football League. The Fireballs is one of four founders of the Polish American Football League.

History 
The team was founded in July 2004 as the 1.KFA Wielkopolska, which is refers as a First American Football Club in the Wielkopolska. It was the second football team in Poland, after the Warsaw Eagles. In 2006 the Fireballs was one of four founders of the Polish American Football League. Since the 2008 season club is competes in the PLFA II.

Season-by-season records 

Note:
 * — season in progress

See also 
 Sports in Poznań

References

External links 
 

American football teams in Poland
Sport in Poznań
American football teams established in 2004
2004 establishments in Poland